Fakhri Kawar is a Jordanian writer and parliamentarian.  He was born in the Jordanian town of Al-Jafour near the border city of Mafraq in 1945.  He was educated in Jerusalem where he received the General Secondary Education Certificate (Tawjihi) from the Ibrahimieh College in Jerusalem in 1964.  He later enrolled in Beirut Arab University to earn a BA in Arabic language and literature in 1971.

Career
Kawar worked upon graduation as a teacher in several private schools in each of Zarqa and Amman. He also worked at Yarmouk University in Irbid for several months in mid-1970s. The Prime Minister at the time, Mudar Badran, dismissed Kawar from his post after the latter published an article entitled "Amman fi el-Qalb" Amman is in the heart" in the Al Ra'i newspaper.

Kawar was elected as member of the Parliament of Jordan in 1989, he ran for Amman 3rd district's seat.

Literary works

Kawar wrote his first published story when he was a student in the preparatory school in Mafraq; the story was aired on the Jordanian Radio in 1961.  Kawar published his stories in several Jordanian and Arab newspapers and magazines including the Egyptian magazine of Al-Qissa (The Story), the Lebanese magazine of AL-Adeeb and Al-Aufq Al-Jadid in Jerusalem.

Membership
Kawar is a member of the Jordanian Writers Associations since it was established in 1974.  He was elected a chairman of the association for four rounds and was the editor-in-chief of the association's Awaraq Magazine.

He was also the editor-in-chief of Wisam, a children's magazine, in mid-1980s.  In 1992, Qawar was elected the General Secretary of the Arab Writers Union in the conference that was held in Amman, he was re-elected for the same position in 1995.

Satirical influence
Kawar wrote the script of one of the earliest comedy television soap-operas in Jordan called "The Dairies of Farhan Sa'eed Farhan". He also wrote the script for a popular satirical radio program called "Dar Abu Warrad", or the house of Abu Warrad in mid-1990s, in addition to another program called "Kol Youm Hikya" ("A Story for Every Day").  In 2009 the Greater Amman Municipality published Kawar's satirical works in one volume.  "Satire for Kawar is not merely aimed to rise laughter, but rather a structure based on a form of the artistic discrepancy," Nabeel Haddad, Jordanian academic and literary critic, said about Kawar's collection.

Publications
 Three Voices, 1972
 Why Did Susie Cry Too Much?, 1973
 No Chess Playing is Allowed, 1976
 I Am the Patriarch, 1981
 The Barrel, 1982
 Job, the Palestinian, 1989
 The Dream of a Night Guard, 1993
 A Man and a Woman, translated 1996

References

1945 births
Living people
Beirut Arab University alumni
Jordanian politicians
Academic staff of Yarmouk University
Jordanian screenwriters
Ibrahimieh College alumni